= Two Satyrs =

Painting by Peter Paul Rubens

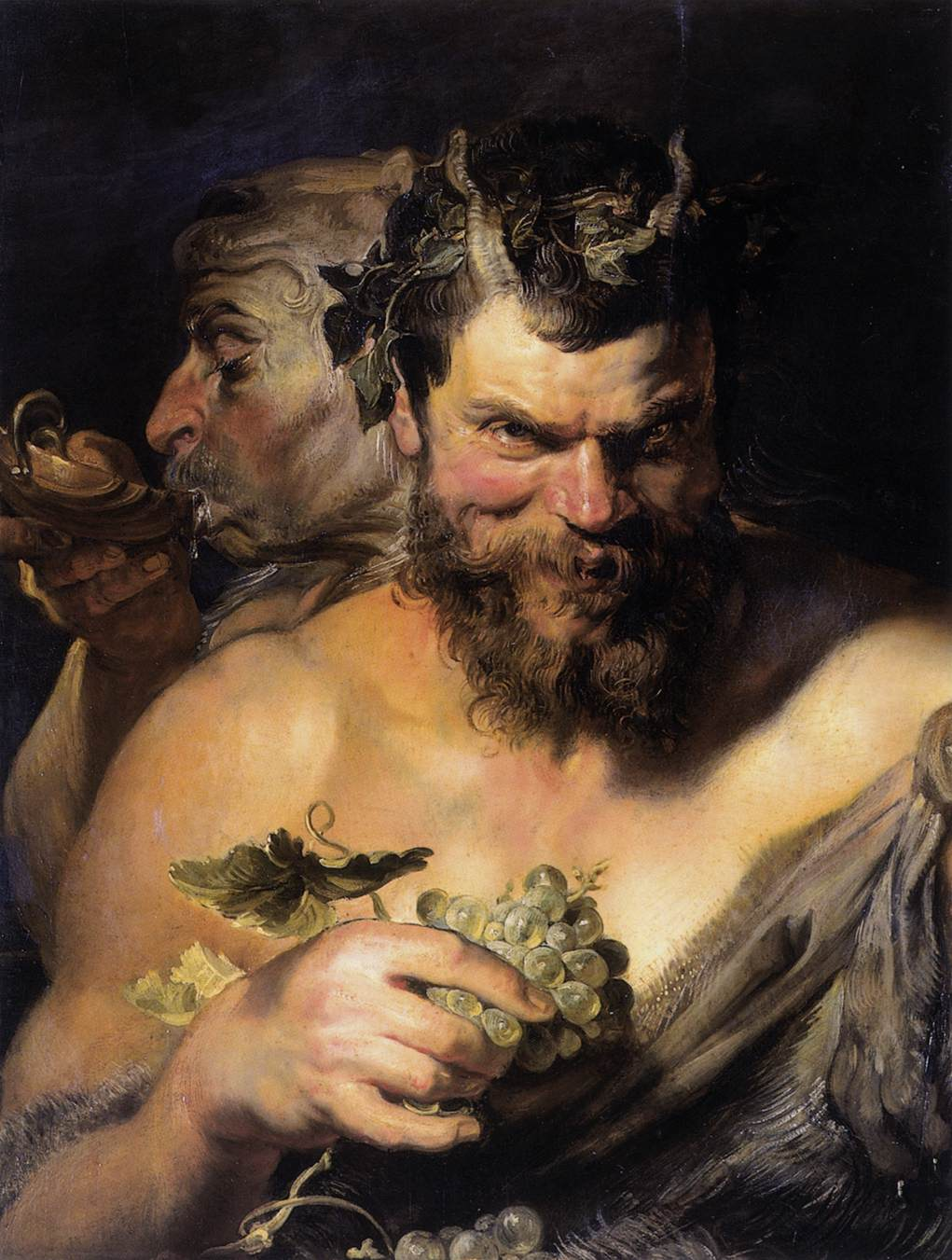

Two Satyrs is a 1617–1619 oil on canvas painting by Peter Paul Rubens. It measures 75.5 by 61 cm and is now in the Alte Pinakothek in Munich.
